The Solutra is the first solar car designed by a group of students, the Raedthuys Solar Team,  of the University of Twente. It participated in the 8th World Solar Challenge in 2005 and finished 9th place. Another Dutch team won the race with their car Nuna 3.

This solar car is the current FIA world record holder on the 1 km with a flying start. This record has been set on August 28, 2005, at the Gronausestraat in Enschede, The Netherlands.

Specifications

See also
 The Twente One TU car which succeeded the Solutra
 The Nuna 4 another Dutch solar car that won the 2007 World Solar Challenge.
 The main article about the Nuna series of Dutch solar cars.
 List of solar car teams

External links
 SolUtra, official page

Solar car racing
Science and technology in the Netherlands